Skylark is an imprint of Bantam Books which publishes books for children. Currently, Skylark is owned by Penguin Random House. Its golden age was in the late 1900s, when it published short fiction books for children, notably Encyclopedia Brown and the Star Wars Jedi Prince Series.

Random House